Stefan Karadzha Peak is the ice-covered peak of elevation 2038 m in the west foothills of Avery Plateau on Loubet Coast in Graham Land, Antarctica.  It has rounded top and steep, partly ice-free west and northeast slopes, and surmounts Erskine Glacier to the northeast, and a tributary to that glacier to the south and west.

The peak is named after Stefan Karadzha (Stefan Dimov, 1840–1868), a leader of the Bulgarian liberation movement, in connection with the settlements of Stefan Karadzha in Northeastern and Stefan Karadzhovo in Southeastern Bulgaria.

Location
British mapping in 1976.

Maps
 Antarctic Digital Database (ADD). Scale 1:250000 topographic map of Antarctica. Scientific Committee on Antarctic Research (SCAR). Since 1993, regularly upgraded and updated.
British Antarctic Territory. Scale 1:200000 topographic map. DOS 610 Series, Sheet W 66 64. Directorate of Overseas Surveys, Tolworth, UK, 1976.

Notes

References
 Bulgarian Antarctic Gazetteer. Antarctic Place-names Commission. (details in Bulgarian, basic data in English)
Stefan Karadzha Peak. SCAR Composite Antarctic Gazetteer

External links
 Stefan Karadzha Peak. Copernix satellite image

Mountains of Graham Land
Bulgaria and the Antarctic
Loubet Coast